The Fontana di Piazza Nicosia is a fountain in Rome, Italy, is the first of the modern fountains of Rome. It is located in the square with the same name.

History
Built in 1572 after the re-activation of the Acqua Vergine aqueduct, it was designed by Giacomo della Porta, and was originally located in the Piazza del Popolo around the obelisk.

Redesign
In 1823, however, after the fountain was judged to be too small for the size of the piazza, Giuseppe Valadier designed a new fountain for the Popolo, that consisted of four mini-fountains of lions surrounding the obelisk, that can be seen today, and the fountain was moved to its final position in the Piazza Nicosia. Of the original fountain, however, only the large octagonal marble basin is original; the upper baluster and display bowl was a later construction.

Remnants
The original design included four Tritons, however, once sculpted, they were judged to be too large for the size of the basin, and so became part of the Fontana del Moro.

External links
Thais:Roma-Fountains

Piazza Nicosia
Rome R. IV Campo Marzio